Elections were held in Michigan on Tuesday, November 2, 2010. Primary elections were held on August 3, 2010.

Federal

United States House 

All 15 of Michigan's seats in the United States House of Representatives were up for election in 2010.

State

Governor and Lieutenant Governor
Republican candidate Rick Snyder beat Democratic Party candidates Virg Bernero 58% to 40% to become Governor. Brian Calley was Snyder's running mate and was elected Lieutenant Governor.

Secretary of State
Republican candidate Ruth Johnson won the election with 50.7%, Democratic Party candidate Jocelyn Benson got 45.2%, Libertarian Party candidate Scotty Boman got 1.8%, U.S. Taxpayers Party candidate Robert Gale got 1.3% and Green Party candidate John A. La Pietra got 1.0%.

Attorney General
Republican candidate Bill Schuette won the election with 52% of the votes, while Democrat David Leyton got 43.5%. Libertarian Party candidate Daniel W. Grow got 2%, and U.S. Taxpayers Party candidate Gerald Van Sickle got 1.9%.

State Senate

Prior to the November 2010 election, in the Michigan Senate the Democratic Party had 16 seats and the Republican Party had 22. After the election, the Republican Party gained 4 seats, giving them 26 seats over the Democratic Party's 12.

State House of Representatives

Prior to the November 2010 election, the Democratic Party held 65 seats in the House and the Republican Party held 42 seats. The Democratic Party lost 18 total seats, and after this election had 47, while the Republican Party's victory brought them up to 63 seats in the House, swaying the Michigan House of Representatives' majority from the Democratic Party to the Republican Party.

Judicial positions
Michigan Supreme Court:

Republican Party candidate Robert P. Young, Jr. won with 27.88%, re-claiming his seat over Democratic Party candidate Denise Langford-Morris with 17.27% and Independent Bob Roddis, who claimed 6.59%.
Republican Party candidate Mary Beth Kelly won with 29.94%, taking the seat from Democratic Party candidate Alton Davis, who got 19.33%.

Michigan Court of Appeals:

1st District candidates Cynthia Stephens and Kurtis T. Wilder were re-elected with 56.12% and 43.88% of the vote. 
2nd District candidate Pat Donofrio was re-elected with 100% of the vote. 
3rd District candidates	Joel P. Hoekstra, David H. Sawyer and Douglas Shapiro were re-elected with 52.32%, 47.68% and 100% of the vote.
4th District candidates	Donald S. Owens and William C. Whitbeck were re-elected with 51.90% and 48.10% of the vote.
All candidates ran uncontested.

Ballot measures
The Michigan Felon Politician Ban Amendment, Proposal 2 was approved, banning felons from running for any political or public office, while the Michigan Constitutional Convention, Proposal 1 was defeated, meaning that the Michigan State Constitution will not be re-written.

Local
Many elections for county and city offices were also held on November 2, 2010.

External links
Elections in Michigan by the Michigan Department of State
Michigan Candidate List at Imagine Election - Search for candidates by address or zip code
Michigan Congressional Races in 2010 for campaign finance data for federal races from OpenSecrets
Michigan State Races in 2010 campaign finance data for state races from Follow the Money

 
Michigan